John Ramsbottom  (15 October 1885 – 14 December 1974) was a British mycologist.

Biography
Ramsbottom was born in Manchester. He graduated from Emmanuel College, Cambridge, and joined the staff of the British Museum of Natural History in 1910.

From 1917 to 1919, he served in Salonika, Greece, first as a civilian protozoologist, then as captain in the Royal Army Medical Corps.  He was appointed a Member of the Order of the British Empire in the 1919 New Year Honours, "for valuable services rendered in connection with Military Operations in Salonika," and later appointed an Officer of the Order.

From 1929 to 1950, he was Keeper of Botany at the British Museum. He served as general secretary and twice as president of the British Mycological Society, and was long editor of its Transactions. He was president of the Quekett Microscopical Club from 1928 to 1931 and was elected an Honorary Member in 1937. He was president of the Linnean Society from 1937 to 1940 and was awarded their Linnean Medal in 1965. Ramsbottom was President of the Society for the History of Natural History from 1943-1972. He was made an Honorary Member in 1972.

Legacy
Dr Ramsbottom made a bequest to the Society in his will and it was decided to utilise this to establish The Ramsbottom Lecture, to be given at the Society's International Meetings, the first being delivered in April 1976.

In 1923, W.D. Buckley in Trans. Brit. Mycol. Soc. vol.9 published Ramsbottomia, which is a genus of fungi in the family Pyronemataceae and named in Ramsbottom's honour.

Works 
Ramsbottom had a lively style both in his lectures and in his writing, which spanned both popular and technical publications. He could write:

Notable among his published works are:

 (1917) "George Edward Massee" Journal of Botany 55: p. 225
 (1923) A handbook of the larger British Fungi British Museum, Dep't of Botany, London, OCLC 4142558 illustrated with engravings by Worthington George Smith.
(1943) Edible Fungi Penguin Books, London
 (1945) Poisonous fungi Penguin Books, London, OCLC 220637
 (1953) Mushrooms and Toadstools: A Study of the Activities of Fungi Collins, London, OCLC 657799

References 

 "John Ramsbottom" Illinois Mycological Association

External links 

 The Ramsbottom Lecture for the Society for the History of Natural History

1885 births
1974 deaths
British botanists
British mycologists
Presidents of the Linnean Society of London
Linnean Medallists
New Naturalist writers
British Mycological Society
Officers of the Order of the British Empire
Fellows of the Linnean Society of London
British Army personnel of World War I
Royal Army Medical Corps officers